KD Singh (born 27 May 1981) is an Indian cricketer. He made his List A debut for Himachal Pradesh in the 2018–19 Vijay Hazare Trophy on 20 September 2018.

References

External links
 

1981 births
Living people
Indian cricketers
Himachal Pradesh cricketers
Place of birth missing (living people)